Joseph Cudjoe is a Ghanaian politician and member of the Seventh Parliament of the Fourth Republic of Ghana representing the Effia Constituency in the Western Region on the ticket of the New Patriotic Party.

Early life and education
Cudjoe was born on 2 October 1964. He hails from Effia a town in the Western Region of Ghana. He received his Bachelor of Science degree in mathematics from the Kwame Nkrumah University of Science and Technology, Kumasi and his MBA in Finance from the University of Ghana.

Career
Joseph Cudjoe started his career as a Mathematics Teacher at the Archbishop Porter Girls Secondary School from January 1995 to October 1995. Cudjoe worked as a lecturer at the Takoradi Technical University from 1995 to 2000. He later joined Eno International, LLC where he worked as a Financial Analysis & Planning Manager from 2000 to 2001. He became a Senior Consultant at SEM International Associates in April 2002 to October 2003 and then later the general manager at SEM International LTD from November 2003 to March 2004.From April 2004 until December 2012, Cudjoe was the Investment Manager for Ghana Cocoa Board.

Politics
Cudjoe entered parliament on 7 January 2013 representing the Effia constituency on the ticket of the New Patriotic Party. He was elected once more to represent the constituency in 2016

Personal life
Cudjoe is married with three children. He identifies as a Christian.

References

Ghanaian MPs 2017–2021
1964 births
Living people
New Patriotic Party politicians
Ghanaian MPs 2021–2025
People from Western Region (Ghana)